Fyodor Yakovlevich Kostenko (22 February 1896–26 May 1942) was a Soviet corps and army commander.

Biography 
He was born in Bolshaya Martynovka, Martynovsky District, Rostov Oblast to an ethnic Ukrainian family. He fought in the Imperial Russian Army during World War I before going over to the Bolsheviks during the subsequent civil war. 

In World War II, he commanded the 26th Army (June – September 1941) and the Southwestern Front (December 1941–April 1942).
He led the task force during the Yelets Operation from 6 December to 16 December 1941, which ended with the defeat of several enemy divisions. 

Kostenko went missing on 26 May 1942, and was presumed killed, being surrounded during the tragic Second Battle of Kharkov.

He was a recipient of the Order of Lenin, the Order of the Red Banner and the Order of the Red Star.

Discovery and reburial
Two sets of human remains were found, identified as officers from their boots. The fabric remains of stripes and the name "Kostenko" on a document helped to identify the remains of the older individual as being Kostenko's. This was later confirmed with DNA testing with his granddaughter. The second set of remains, of a younger and shorter individual, were speculated to be those of Kostenko's adjutant, Captain Vasily Ivanovich Petrovich, who had disappeared with Kostenko. Kostenko's remains were repatriated to Russia, and were interred at the Federal Military Memorial Cemetery on 20 June 2018.

See also
List of solved missing person cases

Sources

Books
 Великая Отечественная война. 1941–1945. События. Люди. Документы: Краткий исторический справочник/ Под общ. ред. О. А. Ржешевского. Сост. Е. К. Жигунов — М.: Политиздат, 1990. — С. 337.
 Колесников Г. М., Лебединский Г. Н., Марков Н. В. и др. Липецк. Справочник-путеводитель. — Воронеж: Центр.-Чернозем. кн. изд-во, 1967.
 

1896 births
1940s missing person cases
1942 deaths
Burials at the Federal Military Memorial Cemetery
Formerly missing people
Missing in action of World War II
Missing person cases in Asia
People from Don Host Oblast
People from Martynovsky District
People of the Soviet invasion of Poland
Recipients of the Order of Lenin
Recipients of the Order of the Red Banner
Recipients of the Order of the Red Star
Russian military personnel of World War I
Soviet lieutenant generals
Soviet military personnel killed in World War II
Soviet military personnel of the Russian Civil War